Giorgos Toussas (born 8 September 1954) is a Greek politician and Member of the European Parliament (MEP) for the Communist Party of Greece; part of the European United Left–Nordic Green Left. He was born in Koilada.

References

External links
 

1954 births
Living people
People from Larissa (regional unit)
Communist Party of Greece MEPs
European United Left–Nordic Green Left MEPs
MEPs for Greece 2004–2009
MEPs for Greece 2009–2014